Dominique Morisseau (born March 13, 1978) is an American playwright and actress from Detroit, Michigan. She has written more than nine plays, three of which are part of a cycle titled The Detroit Project. She received a MacArthur Fellowship (also known as the 'Genius Grant') in 2018.

Early life 
Morisseau was born and grew up in Detroit, Michigan, with her mother and father. Her mother's family is from Mississippi and her father's family is from Haiti. She attended the University of Michigan in Ann Arbor, where she received her BFA in Acting in 2000. 

There she met J. Keys, who is also from Michigan. They married in 2013. Keys was born in Detroit but grew up in Southfield, Michigan, an affluent suburb of the city. He works as a music industry promoter, emcee and hip hop musician.

Career

Acting 
Morisseau began her performance career as a live poetry speaker, primarily in her hometown community of Harmonie Park in Detroit. After graduating from college, she continued acting and worked with several organizations. At the Lark Play Development Center, she worked as an actor in a workshop production of The Mountaintop by Katori Hall, developing the role of Camae. In 2013, in a production at the Actors Theatre of Louisville, she reprised the role of Camae. She continues acting but has said that she would not act in any of her plays' premieres.

Writing 
Morisseau began writing plays in college. She has said that the lack of suitable roles at the University of Michigan drove her to write plays and create the roles she wanted to perform. She wrote The Blackness Blues: Time to Change the Tune, A Sister's Story at this time. 

After college, in 2012 and 2013, she received a Playwrights of New York (PoNY) fellowship at the Lark Play Development Center. She has also worked as a Teaching Artist with City University of New York's Creative Arts Team. 

Morisseau has said that music plays a huge part in her work and often informs the work that she is writing. "It's a resource and clue to my work, and music plays a unifier among cultural barriers."

Morisseau was on the list of Top 20 Most Produced Playwrights in America in 2015–16, with 10 productions of her plays nationwide.

Morisseau is a story editor for the television series Shameless on Showtime and is also credited as a co-producer.

She wrote the book for the jukebox musical Ain't Too Proud—The Life and Times of the Temptations, which is directed by Des McAnuff. The musical opened on Broadway at the Imperial Theatre in March 2019. It played pre-Broadway engagements at the Berkeley Repertory Theatre (2017), the Ahmanson Theatre in Los Angeles (August to September 2018), and the Kennedy Center (July 2018). 

This  play marked Morisseau's Broadway debut. She received a nomination for a Tony Award for Best Book of a Musical, the third Black woman to do so.

Work

The Detroit Project 
Morisseau has written a three-play cycle, titled The Detroit Project. The three plays (in order) are:

Detroit '67 
This play "explores an explosive and decisive moment in a great American city. The play's compelling characters struggle with racial tension and economic instability." It was developed and workshopped at The Public Theater in New York. Detroit '67 eventually was featured at the Classical Theatre of Harlem with the National Black Theatre. It was nominated for eight AUDELCO Theatre Awards and received the 2014  Edward M. Kennedy Prize for Drama Inspired by American History.

Paradise Blue 
Former musician Blue decides to sell his beloved jazz club in order to live out his dreams. He is left with the moral dilemma of leaving his partner, Pumpkin, and his loyal jazz band behind. Morisseau developed this play first at Williamstown Theatre Festival, where it eventually had its world premiere in July 2015. Paradise Blue continued its development at the McCarter Theatre, New York Theatre Workshop, The Public Theater, and the Signature Theatre Company. For this play, Morisseau received the L. Arnold Weissberger Award in 2012.

Skeleton Crew 

The final play in the cycle revolves around a group of auto-plant workers grappling with the likely possibility of foreclosure and impending unemployment. Skeleton Crew received a developmental production at the Lark Play Development Center. Directed by Ruben Santiago-Hudson, this play had its world premiere at the Off-Broadway Linda Gross Theater with the Atlantic Theater Company in May 2016. 

Morisseau won the 2016 Obie Award Special Citation for Collaboration, along with director Santiago-Hudson and the Atlantic Theater Company for Skeleton Crew. The play won the Edgerton Foundation New Play Award in 2015. Skeleton Crew opened on Broadway in January 2022. It was nominated for the Tony Award for Best Play.

Works

Awards 
Morisseau received a MacArthur Fellowship (also known as the 'Genius Grant') fin 2018, which included a stipend of $625,000. She is one of 25 fellows in the 2018 Class.

Morisseau was named an Honoree for the Jane Chambers Playwriting Award, which recognizes plays and performance texts created by women that present a feminist perspective and contain significant opportunities for female performers.

She is a two-time award winner of the NAACP Image Award, which celebrates the outstanding achievements and performances of people of color in the arts, as well as those individuals or groups who promote social justice through their creative endeavors.

Primus Prize by the American Theatre Critics Association (honoree) for Follow Me to Nellie's in 2012
Stavis Playwriting Award
University of Michigan: Emerging Leader Award
City of Detroit: Spirit of Detroit Award
Edward M. Kennedy Prize for Drama, 2014, for her play Detroit '67
Steinberg Playwright Award, 2015
OBIE Award for "Special Citation: Collaboration" for her and Ruben Santiago-Hudson (director) for Skeleton Crew at Atlantic Theater Company, 2016

References

External links

1978 births
Living people
21st-century American dramatists and playwrights
21st-century American women writers
African-American dramatists and playwrights
American stage actresses
American women dramatists and playwrights
MacArthur Fellows
People from Southfield, Michigan
University of Michigan School of Music, Theatre & Dance alumni
21st-century African-American women writers
21st-century African-American writers
20th-century African-American people
20th-century African-American women